The Polynesian imperial pigeon (Ducula aurorae) is a species of bird in the family Columbidae.  It is endemic to French Polynesia. Its natural habitat is subtropical or tropical moist lowland forest and subtropical or tropical moist montane forest. It is threatened by habitat loss.

Description 
This pigeon is approximately 51 cm tall. It is a large, knob-billed pigeon with broad rounded wings. Its plumage is silver-grey on its head and most of underparts with dark bronzy-green upperparts and black undertail-coverts.

Ecology and conservation
This species is formerly found in dense forests but has since been found in secondary habitat such as gardens. It feeds on fruit of a great variety of native and introduced trees. It is now an important seed disperser on Makatea, accelerating the spread of native forest into areas which had been mined and deforested. A 2009 estimate suggested a current population size of only 1000-1600 individuals.

References

Ducula
Birds of the Tuamotus
Birds described in 1848
Taxonomy articles created by Polbot
Taxa named by Titian Peale
Endemic fauna of French Polynesia
Endemic birds of French Polynesia